The Flood is the sixth album released by Gospel Gangstaz. It was released on August 8, 2006 for Alliant Records and featured production Marvin "Twenty/20 Davis", Mr. Solo, Tik Tokk, Chillie' Baby and Jeffrey Baggett. The Flood was the first studio album by the group to not make it on any Billboard charts (All Mixed Up was a compilation album).

Track listing 
"What It Do"- 4:43  
"Stand Up"- 4:22  
"Raise Up"- 4:03  
"My Life"- 4:08  
"Back Then"- 4:13 
"Let's Go"- 3:56  
"Playin' Games"- 2:00  
"Conscious"- 3:46  
"Crazy"- 3:29  
"City Lights"- 4:16  
"My G's"- 3:53  
"Only Jesus"- 3:54

Awards 

In 2007, the album was nominated for a GMA Dove Award for Rap/Hip-Hop Album of the Year at the 38th GMA Dove Awards.

References 

2006 albums
Gospel Gangstaz albums